Yuan-Cheng "Bert" Fung (September 15, 1919 – December 15, 2019) was a Chinese-American bioengineer and writer. He is regarded as a founding figure of bioengineering, tissue engineering, and the "Founder of Modern Biomechanics".

Biography

Fung was born in Jiangsu Province, China in 1919. He earned a bachelor's degree in 1941 and a master's degree in 1943 from the National Central University (later renamed Nanjing University in mainland China and reinstated in Taiwan), and earned a Ph.D. from the California Institute of Technology in 1948. Fung was Professor Emeritus and Research Engineer at the University of California San Diego. He published prominent texts along with Pin Tong who was then at Hong Kong University of Science & Technology. Fung died at the Jacobs Medical Center in San Diego, California, aged 100, on December 15, 2019.

Research
He is the author of numerous books including Foundations of Solid Mechanics, Continuum Mechanics, and a series of books on Biomechanics. He is also one of the principal founders of the Journal of Biomechanics and was a past chair of the ASME International Applied Mechanics Division. In 1972, Fung established the Biomechanics Symposium under the American Society of Mechanical Engineers. This biannual summer meeting, first held at the Georgia Institute of Technology, became the annual Summer Bioengineering Conference. Fung and colleagues were also the first to recognize the importance of residual stress on arterial mechanical behavior.

Fung's Law
Fung's famous exponential strain constitutive equation for preconditioned soft tissues is 

with

Materials that follow this law are known as Fung-elastic.

Honors and awards
 Theodore von Karman Medal, 1976
 Otto Laporte Award, 1977
 Worcester Reed Warner Medal, 1984
 Jean-Leonard-Marie Poiseuille Award, 1986
 Timoshenko Medal, 1991
 Lissner Award for Bioengineering, from ASME
 Borelli Medal, from ASB
 Landis Award, from Microcirculation Society
 Alza Award, from BMES
 Melville Medal, 1994
 United States National Academy of Engineering Founders Award (NAE Founders Award), 1998
 National Medal of Science, 2000
 Fritz J. and Dolores H. Russ Prize, 2007 ("for the characterization and modeling of human tissue mechanics and function leading to prevention and mitigation of trauma.")
 Revelle Medal, from UC San Diego, 2016

Fung was elected to the United States National Academy of Sciences (1993), the National Academy of Engineering (1979), the Institute of Medicine (1991), the Academia Sinica (1968), and was a Foreign Member of the Chinese Academy of Sciences (1994 election).

References

External links
 Classical and Computational Solid Mechanics 
Profile at UCSD
Y.C. Fung, Mechanics of Man, Acceptance Speech for the Timoshenko Medal.
YC Fung Young Investigator Award
Molecular & Cellular Biomechanics: In Honor of The 90th Birthday of Professor Yuan Cheng Fung 

1919 births
2019 deaths
20th-century American biologists
20th-century American engineers
21st-century American biologists
21st-century American engineers
American bioengineers
American centenarians
American science writers
American writers of Chinese descent
Biologists from Jiangsu
Biomechanics
Beijing No. 4 High School alumni
Chongqing Nankai Secondary School alumni
California Institute of Technology alumni
California Institute of Technology faculty
Chinese emigrants to the United States
Educators from Changzhou
Engineers from Jiangsu
Foreign members of the Chinese Academy of Sciences
Members of Academia Sinica
Members of the United States National Academy of Engineering
Members of the United States National Academy of Sciences
Men centenarians
National Medal of Science laureates
Nanjing University alumni
National Central University alumni
Scientists from California
Scientists from Changzhou
Tissue engineering
University of California, San Diego faculty
Writers from Changzhou
Members of the National Academy of Medicine